Hindus are a significant majority in the United Arab Emirates and there are more than 1,239,600 Hindus living in the United Arab Emirates as of 2022, constituting around 35% of the population in the nation. Hinduism is followed mainly by the significant Indian population in the United Arab Emirates.

Background 
After the discovery of crude oil and large-scale industrialization and urbanization in the UAE many workers and employees came to UAE for work and employment purposes in the nation. Many South Asians immigrated there for work and employed and after 2000, Dubai became a global hotspot for mainly South Asians, many of them were Hindus.

Demographics 
Most of the Hindu diaspora in UAE are Indian, especially from Tamil Nadu, Kerala, Maharashtra and Punjab. The other Hindus are from Nepal, Pakistan, Bangladesh, Sri Lanka and Bhutan.

Temples 
There are currently two temples in Dubai and one temple in Abu Dhabi.
 Hindu Temple, Dubai
 Hindu temple, Jebel Ali
 BAPS Shri Swaminarayan Mandir, Abu Dhabi

The Hindu Temple, Dubai , located in Bur Dubai  , is locally referred to as "Shiva and Krishna Mandir". It was built in 1958.

The second Hindu Temple of Dubai is in Jebel Ali Village next to the Sikh Gurudwara and Churches Complex. The temple was opened on October 5th 2022.

In July 2013, an Arab businessman donated land for setting up a temple just outside the city of Abu Dhabi. In August 2015, the UAE government announced permission for building a Hindu temple on it. The announcement was made during the visit of Indian Prime Minister Narendra Modi to the UAE. BAPS Shri Swaminarayan Mandir Abu Dhabi in Abu Dhabi is currently under construction. It had its foundation stone laying ceremony in April 2019.

Cremation Facilities for Hindus 
There are two operating cremation facilities for the Hindu community, one in Abu Dhabi and one in Dubai.

See also 
 Religion in the United Arab Emirates
 Sikhism in the United Arab Emirates

References

Citations

General bibliography

External links 
 United Arab Emirates 2017 International Religious Freedom Report (PDF)